The 1901–02 Bucknell Bison men's basketball team represented Bucknell University during the 1901–02 collegiate men's basketball season. The team finished the season with an overall record of 12–2.

Schedule

|-

References

Bucknell Bison men's basketball seasons
Bucknell
Bucknell
Bucknell